Thwaitesia is a genus of comb-footed spiders that was first described by Octavius Pickard-Cambridge in 1881.

T. bracteata are about the same size. They are similar in appearance to members of both Spintharus and Episinus.

Species
 it contains twenty-three species, found in the tropics worldwide:
Thwaitesia affinis O. Pickard-Cambridge, 1882 – Panama to Paraguay
Thwaitesia algerica Simon, 1895 – Algeria
Thwaitesia argentata Thorell, 1890 – Indonesia (Sumatra)
Thwaitesia argenteoguttata (Tullgren, 1910) – Kenya, Tanzania
Thwaitesia argenteosquamata (Lenz, 1891) – Madagascar
Thwaitesia argentiopunctata (Rainbow, 1916) – Australia (Queensland)
Thwaitesia aureosignata (Lenz, 1891) – Madagascar
Thwaitesia bracteata (Exline, 1950) – Trinidad, Colombia to Paraguay
Thwaitesia dangensis Patel & Patel, 1972 – India
Thwaitesia glabicauda Zhu, 1998 – China
Thwaitesia inaurata (Vinson, 1863) – Réunion
Thwaitesia margaritifera O. Pickard-Cambridge, 1881 (type) – India, Sri Lanka, China, Vietnam
Thwaitesia meruensis (Tullgren, 1910) – Tanzania
Thwaitesia nigrimaculata Song, Zhang & Zhu, 2006 – China
Thwaitesia nigronodosa (Rainbow, 1912) – Australia (Queensland)
Thwaitesia phoenicolegna Thorell, 1895 – Myanmar, Vietnam
Thwaitesia pulcherrima Butler, 1883 – Madagascar
Thwaitesia rhomboidalis Simon, 1903 – Equatorial Guinea
Thwaitesia scintillans Kulczyński, 1911 – New Guinea
Thwaitesia simoni (Keyserling, 1884) – Brazil
Thwaitesia spinicauda Thorell, 1895 – Myanmar
Thwaitesia splendida Keyserling, 1884 – Panama to Venezuela
Thwaitesia turbinata Simon, 1903 – Sierra Leone

Formerly included:
T. argyrodiformis (Yaginuma, 1952) (Transferred to Chrysso)

Nomen dubium
T. conifera (Blackwall, 1862

See also
 List of Theridiidae species

References

Further reading

External links

Araneomorphae genera
Spiders of Africa
Spiders of Asia
Spiders of Australia
Spiders of South America
Taxa named by Octavius Pickard-Cambridge
Theridiidae